David Renfrew White (1847–1937) was a notable New Zealand teacher, educationalist and university professor. He was born in Edinburgh, Midlothian, Scotland in 1847.

References

1847 births
1937 deaths
New Zealand schoolteachers
Academic staff of the University of Otago
Academics from Edinburgh
Scottish emigrants to New Zealand